Qatul (also Romanized as Qāţūl; also known as Qāţūn) is a village in Howmeh Rural District, in the Central District of Garmsar County, Semnan Province, Iran. At the 2006 census, its population was 164, in 42 families.

References 

Populated places in Garmsar County